The St. Mary's Church, Athlone is a Church of Ireland parish church situated in the town of Athlone, County Westmeath.

History 
Located in the centre of Ireland and straddling the provincial boundary between Leinster and Connaught, Athlone's history dates back to 1210 and the building of a castle by King John.

The present St. Mary's Church of Ireland is situated within the medieval town walls on an elevated site. There has been a church on these grounds since before Reformation times. The church was built in 1827, beside the belfry of an earlier church, it has been describe as "a neat little edifice with a square embattled tower".

References 

Churches in County Westmeath
Diocese of Meath and Kildare
Churches completed in 1827
19th-century churches in the Republic of Ireland